Cops and Robbers may refer to:

Film
Cops and Robbers (1951 film), a 1951 Italian film
Cops and Robbers (1973 film), a 1973 film starring Cliff Gorman and Joseph Bologna
Cops and Robbers (1979 film), a 1979 Hong Kong film
Cops and Robbers (1993 film), an Australian film
Cops and Robbers (2017 film), an American film
"Cops and Robbers", an episode of the American TV show Castle

Music
"Cops and Robbers" (song), a 2007 song by The Hoosiers
"Cops and Robbers", a 1956 song by Kent Harris aka "Boogaloo And His Gallant Crew"
 Cops & Robbers, a 2013 mixplay by Hip Hop artist Gunplay

Games
Cops 'n' Robbers, a 1985 video game by Atlantis for various 8-bit computers
Pursuit-evasion, a family of problems in mathematics and computer science
Tag (game), a children's game also known as cops and robbers